The Bank of Botswana (BoB) is the central bank of Botswana.

When Botswana gained independence from Britain in 1966, the country was part of the Rand Monetary Area (RMA). In 1974 Botswana withdrew from the RMA, and the Bank of Botswana and Financial Institution Acts established the legal framework for a central bank in Botswana to be established in July 1975, with Christopher H. L. Hermans as the first Governor. The pula was launched as a national currency in 1976, and in 1977 the Bank of Botswana became the government banker.

The Bank manages Botswana's sovereign wealth fund, the Pula Fund.

History

Governors of the Bank of Botswana
 July 1975 - 1978: Christopher H. L. Hermans
 January 1978 - 1980: Brenton C. Leavitt
 November 1980 - 1981: Festus Mogae
 January 1981 - June 1987: Charles Nyonyintono Kikonyogo
 July 1987 - 1997: Christopher H. L. Hermans
 July 1997 - September 1999: Baledzi Gaolathe
 October 1999 - 2016: Linah Mohohlo
 21 October 2016 – present: Moses Pelaelo

See also
Central banks and currencies of Africa
Economy of Botswana
Minister of Finance (Botswana)
List of central banks

References

External links
 Bank of Botswana official site

Botswana
Economy of Botswana
Government of Botswana
Banks of Botswana
Banks of Gaborone
Banks established in 1975
1975 establishments in Botswana